Aaron Beeney (born 1 January 1984) is an English professional darts player who competes in the Professional Darts Corporation events.

Career
Working in the prison service, Beeney represented English Prisons against Danish Prisons. He also has three caps for county in his county career for London.

2020

Beeney entered PDC Q-School in January 2020 and won his Tour Card on the third day by beating Jarred Cole 5–4 in the final round, after surviving match darts. He will play on the PDC ProTour in 2020 and 2021.

After 15 defeats across Players Championship and European Tour qualifying tournaments, Beeney picked up his first win as a tour card holder at Players Championship 11 by beating Scott Waites 6–5.

2021

At Players Championship 2, Beeney defeated reigning World Champion Gerwyn Price 6–5.

In the 2021 UK Open, Aaron Beeney was defeated 6-2  by Lisa Ashton, the first woman to win at this tournament in 16 years, whilst setting a new world record for women in a televised match.

Beeney had his best run to date at Players Championship 10, where he reached his first ever PDC semi-final. On the way, he defeated former World Champions Rob Cross and Raymond van Barneveld, before losing out to Michael Smith 7–4.

References

External links

1984 births
Living people
Professional Darts Corporation former tour card holders
English darts players
People from Sittingbourne